Sharon Anderson may refer to:
 Sharon Anderson (nephrologist) (born 1949), American physician
 Sharon Anderson (singer), Canadian singer

See also
 Sharon Anderson-Gold (1947–2011), professor in the areas of ethics and philosophy